Elvitegravir/cobicistat/emtricitabine/tenofovir, sold under the brand name Stribild, also known as the Quad pill, is a fixed-dose combination antiretroviral medication for the treatment of HIV/AIDS.  Elvitegravir, emtricitabine and tenofovir disoproxil directly suppress viral reproduction. Cobicistat increases the effectiveness of the combination by inhibiting the liver and gut wall enzymes that metabolize elvitegravir. It is taken by mouth.

The drug is manufactured by Gilead Sciences.

Serum creatinine (a marker of kidney function) may increase with use of Elvitegravir/cobicistat/emtricitabine/tenofovir. This is caused by cobicistat's inhibition of tubular secretion in the nephron. An increase of up to 0.3 mg/dL is expected; if serum creatinine level increases by 0.4 mg/dL or more, further evaluation for other causes of acute kidney injury is recommended.

Society and culture

Legal status 
Elvitegravir/cobicistat/emtricitabine/tenofovir gained approval by the U.S. Food and Drug Administration (FDA) on August 27, 2012, for use in adults starting antiretroviral treatment for the first time as part of the fixed dose combination.

Economics 
Gilead maintains that its pricing is comparable to other HIV medications on the market. Elvitegravir/cobicistat/emtricitabine/tenofovir (Stribild) is priced at 39 percent higher than emtricitabine/rilpivirine/tenofovir (Complera), a three-drug HIV regimen approved a year earlier. At the time of Complera's approval, there were concerns about the  wholesale cost of efavirenz/emtricitabine/tenofovir (Atripla), which is marketed by Gilead and Bristol-Myers Squibb. HIV drug prices have increased substantially. Rising drug costs and HIV cases, combined with tighter state budgets may burden the AIDS Drug Assistance Program (ADAP) to the breaking point. Kaiser Family Foundation reports that ADAP provided HIV drug benefit to 138,000 people in 2011, with a waiting list totaling 2,030 HIV-positive individuals. Many states including California, Colorado, Georgia, and Virginia are considering measures to cut ADAP spending.

References

 FDA label
 Stribild: High cost of new HIV drug may not be worth the benefit

External links 
 

CYP3A4 inhibitors
Fixed dose combination (antiretroviral)
Gilead Sciences
Hepatotoxins